= Africa Information Highway initiative =

The African Information Highway Initiative is a mega network of live open data platforms (ODPs) linking all African countries and 16 regional organizations. It was launched in November, 2012 by Statistics Department of the African Development Bank (AfDB) as a platform for sharing data and resources.
